Oenothera suffrutescens (syn. Gaura coccinea) is a species of flowering plant in the evening primrose family known as scarlet beeblossom and scarlet gaura.

Distribution
The plant is native to much of North America, especially the western and central sections. It can be found in many habitats and is occasionally an urban weed.

Description
Scarlet beeblossom is a perennial herb growing from a woody base and heavy roots. The stems may reach anywhere from 10 centimeters in height to over a meter and sprawling, and they are often covered in small, stiff hairs. The thin to thick clumps of stems are covered in linear to somewhat oval-shaped leaves one to seven centimeters long. Atop the stems are spike inflorescences of several flowers each. The flower has four long, stiff sepals which open and fall away from the flower to lie reflexed toward the stem. There are four spoon-shaped petals which are white to yellowish and may turn pink with age. Each flower has eight long stamens with large red, pink, or yellowish anthers arranged around a long stigma. The fruit is a woody capsule under a centimeter long.

References

External links
 Lady Bird Johnson Wildflower Center Native Plant Information Network−NPIN profile of Gaura coccinea (Scarlet beeblossom)
UC CalPhotos gallery

suffrutescens
Flora of North America